This is a list of buildings that are examples of the Art Deco architectural style in Kentucky, United States.

Bowling Green 
 Booth Fire & Safety, Bowling Green, 1948
 Capitol Arts Center (former Columbia Theatre), Bowling Green, 1921
 Galloway Farm Equipment (now Booth Fire & Safety), Modern Automotive District, Bowling Green, 1948
 Galloway Motor Company Building, Modern Automotive District, Bowling Green, 1948
 WLBJ Building, Bowling Green, 1940
 William Hardcastle Filling Station, Modern Automotive District, Bowling Green, 1948

Lexington 
 F. W. Woolworth Building, Lexington, 1946
 Lexington Laundry Co., Lexington, 1929
 Lexington National Guard Armory, Lexington, 1941

Louisville 
 1495 South 11th Street Building, Louisville, 1935
 American Bluegrass Marble, Louisville
 AT&T Building, Louisville, 1930
 Bernheim Distillery Boiling Plant, Louisville, 1937
 Bowman Field, Louisville, 1921
 Bridges, Smith & Co (former Four Roses Bourbon), Louisville, 1870, 1940s
 Brown-Forman Warehouse, Louisville, 1936
 Byck's Department Store, Louisville, 1924
 Charles D. Jacob Elementary School, Louisville, 1932
 Courier-Journal Building, Louisville
 Fire Department Headquarters, Louisville, 1937
 Fiscal Court Building, Louisville, 1938
 Fisher-Klosterman Building (former Bernheim Distillery Bottling Plant), Louisville, 1937
 George Rogers Clark Memorial Bridge, Louisville, 1929
 Jacob Elementary, Louisville, 1932
 James Russell Lowell Elementary School, Louisville, 1931
 Jones–Dabney Company Laboratory, Louisville, 1935
 Kelley Technical Coatings, Louisville, 1933
 LG&E Building, Louisville, 1925–1928
 Louisville Cotton Mills Administration Building (now a restaurant), Louisville, 1936–1941
 Louisville Fire Department No. 9, Louisville, 1946
 Louisville National Guard Armory, Louisville, 1942
 Louisville Public Works, Louisville, 1934
 Meyzeek Middle School, Louisville, 1929
 Miller Paper Company Buildings, Louisville, 1947
 Norton Healthcare Building, Louisville, 1925
 Ohio Theatre façade, Louisville, 1941
 Seagram's Distillery, Louisville, 1933
 Sears, Roebuck and Company Store, Louisville, 1928
 South Central Bell Company Office Building, Louisville, 1930
 Trinity High School, Louisville, 1941
 Valley Traditional High School, Louisville, 1936, 1953
 Vogue Theatre, Louisville, 1939
 WHAS Radio Transmitter Building, Louisville, 1930s
 Wheeling Corrugating Company Building, Louisville

Scottsville 
 Lyric Theater, Scottsville, 1930s
 Horse Shoe Cafeteria, Scottsville Downtown Commercial Historic District, Scottsville, 1915 and 1935
 Washington Overall Factory, Scottsville Downtown Commercial Historic District, Scottsville, 1928, 1930s

Whitesburg 
 Boone Youth Drop-In Center (former Boone Motor Company), Whitesburg Historic District, Whitesburg, 1930
 Quillen Building, Whitesburg Historic District, Whitesburg, 1948
 Whitesburg High School Gymnasium, Whitesburg Historic District, Whitesburg, 1940s

Other cities 
 Arista Theater, Lebanon Historic Commercial District, Lebanon, 1935
 Ashland Armory, Ashland, 1948
 Bell Theater, Pineville
 Burke's Bakery, Danville, 1930
 Caldwell County Courthouse, Princeton Downtown Commercial District, Princeton, 1939
 Capitol Theater, Princeton Downtown Commercial District, Princeton, 1930s
 Carlisle Armory, Carlisle, 1941
 City Hall, Paintsville, 1940
 Coca-Cola Bottling Plant, Paducah, 1939
 Coca-Cola Plant, Shelbyville, 1937
 Devou Park Band Shell, Covington, 1939
 Elizabethtown Armory, Elizabethtown, 1948
 Estill County Courthouse, Irvine Historic Business District, Irvine, 1939
 Eversole Building, Harlan Commercial District, Harlan, 1936
 Estill County Youth Center (former National Guard Armory), Ravenna, 1934
 Greenville City Hall, Greenville, 1940
 Harrodsburg Armory (now Mercer Area Family Education), Harrodsburg, 1942
 Horse Cave State Bank, Horse Cave, 1937
 Jeffersontown Colored School, Jeffersontown, 1930
 Kentucky Theatre/Hartford City Hall Complex, Downtown Hartford Historic District, Hartford, late 1930s
 Lane Theater, Williamsburg, 1948
 Ludlow Theater, Ludlow, 1946
 Mack Theatre, Irvine Historic Business District, Irvine, 1930s
 Madisonville Armory, Madisonville, 1947
 Marianne Theater, Bellevue, 1942
 Ohio County Courthouse, Downtown Hartford Historic District, Hartford, 1943
 Old Wayne County High School, Monticello, 1941
 Paintsville City Hall, Paintsville, 1940
 Paramount Arts Center, Ashland, 1931
 Richmond Armory, Richmond, 1942
 Russelville Armory, Russelville, 1934
 S. E. Cooke Building, Harrodsburg
 Simon Kenton High School, Independence, 1937
 Somerset Armory, Somerset, 1948
 Springfield Armory, Springfield, 1942
 State Theatre, Elizabethtown, 1942
 United States Bullion Depository, Fort Knox, 1936
 United States Post Office, Covington, 1941
 University of Kentucky Cooperative Extension Building (former National Guard Armory), Carlisle, 1941
 Watkins Department Store, Paducah, 1941
 Webster County Courthouse, Dixon, 1938
 Williamsburg National Guard Armory, Williamsburg, 1941
 Worsham Hall, Henderson, 1936

See also 
 List of Art Deco architecture
 List of Art Deco architecture in the United States

References 

 "Art Deco & Streamline Moderne Buildings." Roadside Architecture.com. Retrieved 2019-01-03.
 Cinema Treasures. Retrieved 2022-09-06
 "Court House Lover". Flickr. Retrieved 2022-09-06
 "Louisville Art Deco". Retrieved 2019-01-20.
 "New Deal Map". The Living New Deal. Retrieved 2020-12-25.
 "SAH Archipedia". Society of Architectural Historians. Retrieved 2021-11-21.

External links 
 

Art Deco architecture
Art Deco
Art Deco architecture in Kentucky
Kentucky-related lists